In baseball statistics, a double play (denoted as DP) is the act of making two outs during the same continuous play. One double play is recorded for every defensive player who participates in the play, regardless of how many of the outs in which they were directly involved, and is counted in addition to whatever putouts and assists might also apply. Double plays can occur any time there is at least one baserunner and fewer than two outs. 

Most of the career leaders are relatively recent players who have benefitted from improved infield defense, with equipment of better quality; only six of the top 25 players made their major league debut before 1966, none of them before 1944. Only seven of the top 84 single-season totals were recorded before 1949, and only two of the top 152 were recorded before 1918. Brooks Robinson holds the record for the most career double plays by a third baseman with 618.

Key

List

Stats updated through the 2022 season

Other Hall of Famers

Notes

References

External links

Major League Baseball statistics
Double plays as a third baseman